Domicela Katarzyna Kopaczewska (born 4 October 1958 in Aleksandrów Kujawski) is a Polish politician. She was elected to the Sejm on 25 September 2005, getting 4,870 votes in 5 Toruń district as a candidate from the Civic Platform list.

See also
Members of Polish Sejm 2005-2007

External links
Domicela Kopaczewska - parliamentary page - includes declarations of interest, voting record, and transcripts of speeches.

Members of the Polish Sejm 2005–2007
Women members of the Sejm of the Republic of Poland
Civic Platform politicians
1958 births
Living people
21st-century Polish women politicians
Kazimierz Wielki University in Bydgoszcz alumni
Members of the Polish Sejm 2007–2011
Members of the Polish Sejm 2011–2015